Vestire gli ignudi is a 1953 Italian drama film directed by Marcello Pagliero and starring Gabriele Ferzetti. It is based on the play Vestire gli ignudi (Clothing the Naked) by Luigi Pirandello.

Cast
 Gabriele Ferzetti	as Ludovico Nota
 Eleonora Rossi Drago as Ersilia Drei
 Pierre Brasseur as Console Grotti
 Frank Latimore as Franco Laspiga
 Micheline Francey	as Signora Grotti

References

External links

1953 films
Films based on works by Luigi Pirandello
1950s Italian-language films
Italian films based on plays
Films directed by Marcello Pagliero
Italian drama films
1953 drama films
Italian black-and-white films
1950s Italian films